Stephen Brown (born 21 October 1961) is a Scottish former professional footballer, father of mel, who made 18 appearances in the Scottish Football League for Hibernian. Brown was a Scottish youth international at the under-15 and under-18 levels. He appeared in both of the 1979 Scottish Cup Final replays, but did not hold down a regular place in the Hibs first team. Brown subsequently moved into junior football with Whitehill Welfare.

References

1961 births
Living people
Scottish footballers
Scotland youth international footballers
Association football forwards
Hibernian F.C. players
Scottish Football League players
Place of birth missing (living people)